Arthur Gibson may refer to:

 Arthur Gibson (cricketer, born 1889) (1889–1950), Royal Navy officer and cricketer
 Arthur Gibson (Kent cricketer) (1863–1895), English cricketer
 Arthur Gibson (Lancashire cricketer) (1863–1932), English cricketer
 Arthur Lummis Gibson (1899–1959), English politician and trade unionist
 Arthur Sumner Gibson (1844–1927), English rugby union player
 Arthur Gibson (footballer), active in Spain and France